Richard Reelie is a paralympic athlete from Canada competing mainly in category T52 wheelchair racing events.

Richard has competed at five Paralympics, the first in 1988 saw Richard win 3 gold medals in the Class 1B shot, discus and javelin.  From 1992 Richard concentrated on wheelchair racing winning the gold medal in the TW2 400m and 800m and silver medals in the 200m and 1500m. The 1996 Summer Paralympics were the first time Richard failed to medal in any event and left him without a medal in the 200m, 400m and 800m.  He returned to medal winning form in the 2000 Summer Paralympics winning silver in the 800m and bronze in the 5000m but missing out in the 1500m.

References

Paralympic track and field athletes of Canada
Athletes (track and field) at the 1988 Summer Paralympics
Athletes (track and field) at the 1992 Summer Paralympics
Athletes (track and field) at the 1996 Summer Paralympics
Athletes (track and field) at the 2000 Summer Paralympics
Athletes (track and field) at the 2004 Summer Paralympics
Paralympic gold medalists for Canada
Paralympic silver medalists for Canada
Paralympic bronze medalists for Canada
Living people
Medalists at the 1988 Summer Paralympics
Medalists at the 1992 Summer Paralympics
Medalists at the 2000 Summer Paralympics
Year of birth missing (living people)
Paralympic medalists in athletics (track and field)
Canadian male wheelchair racers